Roscoe Tanner was the defending champion but lost in the first round to Johan Kriek.

There was no result for the tournament due to rain. The four semifinalists in the tournament were Jimmy Connors, Brian Teacher, Peter Fleming and Gene Mayer.

Seeds

Draw

Finals

Top half

Section 1

Section 2

Bottom half

Section 3

Section 4

References
 1980 Congoleum Classic Draw - Men's Singles

Congoleum Classic - Singles